The second USS Emma (SP-1223) was a United States Navy patrol vessel in service from 1917 to 1918.

Emma was built as a private motorboat of the same name in 1891. In 1917, the U.S. Navy acquired her from her owner for use as a section patrol boat during World War I. She was placed in non-commissioned service as USS Emma (SP-1223).

Assigned to the 5th Naval District, Emma served on patrol duties until sometime in 1918.

References
 
 SP-1223 Emma at Department of the Navy Naval History and Heritage Command Online Library of Selected Images: U.S. Navy Ships -- Listed by Hull Number "SP" #s and "ID" #s -- World War I Era Patrol Vessels and other Acquired Ships and Craft numbered from SP-1200 through SP-1299
 NavSource Online: Section Patrol Craft Photo Archive Emma (SP 1223)

Patrol vessels of the United States Navy
World War I patrol vessels of the United States
1891 ships